Ninḫursaĝ ( Ninḫarsang) sometimes transcribed Ninursag, Ninḫarsag, or Ninḫursaĝa, also known as Damgalnuna or Ninmah, was the ancient Sumerian mother goddess of the mountains, and one of the seven great deities of Sumer. She is known earliest as a nurturing or fertility goddess. Temple hymn sources identify her as the "true and great lady of heaven" (possibly in relation to her standing on the mountain) and kings of Lagash were "nourished by Ninhursag's milk". She is the tutelary deity to several Sumerian leaders.

Her most well known myths are Enki and Ninhursag describing her dealings with Enki resulting from his sexual exploits, and Enki and Ninmah a creation myth wherein the two deities compete to create humans. She is referenced or makes brief appearances in others as well, most notably as the mother of Ninurta in the Anzu Epic.

Names
Nin-hursag means "lady of the sacred mountain" from Sumerian NIN "lady" and ḪAR.SAG̃  "sacred mountain, foothill", possibly a reference to the site of her temple, the E-Kur (House of mountain deeps) at Eridu. She had many names including Ninmah ("Great Queen"); Nintu ("Lady of Birth"); Mamma or Mami (mother); Aruru, Belet-Ili (mistress of the gods, Akkadian).

According to the 'Ninurta's Exploits' myth, her name was changed from Ninmah to Ninhursag by her son Ninurta.  As Ninmena, according to a Babylonian investiture ritual, she placed the golden crown on the king in the Eanna temple.

Possibly included among the original mother goddesses was Damgalnuna/Diĝirmaḫ (great wife of the prince) or Damkina (“true wife”), the consort of the god Enki.

Nintur was another name assigned to Ninhursag as a birth goddess, though sometimes she was a separate goddess entirely.

The mother goddess had many epithets including shassuru or 'womb goddess', tabsut ili 'midwife of the gods', 'mother of all children' and 'mother of the gods'.  In this role she is identified with Ki in the Enuma Elish.  She had shrines in both Eridu and Kish. It has also been speculated that she was worshipped under the name Belet-Nagar in Mari. However, it has also been proposed that the name Ninhursag in documents from Mari should be understood as a logographic writing of the name Shalash, the wife of Dagan, who was the goddess of Bitin near Alalakh rather than Nagar (modern Tell Brak) in the Khabur Triangle. Belet Nagar has alternatively been identified with Hurrian deities: Shaushka (though this proposal was met with criticism) or Nabarbi.

Function
As evidenced by the large number of names, epithets, and areas of worship associated with her cult, Ninhursag's function in religion had many different aspects and shifted notably over time. Ninhursag was not the tutelary goddess of any major city, her cult presence being attested first in smaller towns and villages. It is possible that she was viewed originally more as a nurturing than a birth goddess. Another theory posits that, along with the goddess Nintur, she was the birth goddess of wild and domesticated animals. Her connection to the biological process of childbirth in worship is suspected to have developed later, as she began to by syncretized with other 'birth-goddesses', and took on her  Bēlet-ilī name. In this birth aspect, she is called by the kings of Lagash as "the midwife who suckled them". From the third Early Dynastic Period and onward, the most common Ninhursag epithets emphasize her as the supreme "mother of the world". This term of mother, Julia Asher-Greve and 
Joan Westenholz argue, was analogous to the generic 'father' used for gods such as Anu and Enki, and therefore transcends the biological concept of motherhood. Later in the Neo-Sumerian Period she became more associated with the physical process of birth. (i.e. her offerings including umbilical cord cutters) In the Old Babylonian Period some posit a decline in her worship, as she loses her high status as part of the four supreme deities of the pantheon however Westenholz posits that her cult continued to be relevant but shifted function, as she became  Bēlet-ilī.

She had a documented role in Sumerian kingship ideology. The first known royal votive gift, recovered from Kiš, was donated by a king referring to himself as ‘beloved son of Ninḫursaĝa'. Votive objects dedicated to her Diĝirmaḫ name were recovered in Adab, dating to the Early Dynastic Period.

She could also be understood not simply as affiliated with mountains, but as a personification of mountain (or earth) as well. One text in Sumerian the Disputation between Summer and Winter describes the creation of the seasons as the result of the copulation of Ninhursag (the earth) and Enlil. Another temple hymn from Gudea praising Ningirsu (epithet of Ninurta) describes him as having been born by a mountain range. She had a connection to the wild animals, particularly deer, who dwell on or around the mountains. Stags appear in façade on the walls of her temples, as well as in works containing the lion headed eagle, a symbol of Ninurta. One composition, a dedication of Ninhursag's Kes temple, mentions deer, bison, and wild goats in connection to the building.

Her and her other names could also appear in ritual incantations for a variety of functions, some of which include Damgalnunna to protect from evil demons, and Ninhursaga and Nintur in birth related incantation. As Ninmah she has appeared occasionally in medical texts, such as one from Sultantepe which describes a ritual and offerings to be performed for the goddess in order to cure bedwetting. It is suggested that her role in performing healing connects to that of her healing Enki in Enki and Ninhursag.

Association with other Deities

Consorts and Children

Her most well attested consorts are Enki and Shul-pa-e. The latter is identified as the father of her son Panigingarra in the god list An=Anum. Another of her sons, sometimes listed alongside Panigingarra, was Ashgi.

In Lagash, she was associated with Enlil as his wife, and the mother of Ningirsu (Assimilated with Ninurta.) She is Ninurta's mother as Bēlet-ilī/Mami in Anzu and other myth as well. Some Sumerian sources identify her as both Enlil's wife and sister, likely to rectify earlier traditions where she was Enlil's spouse, before later traditions had the goddess Ninlil as his wife instead. After this change Ninhursag was reassigned as Enlil's elder sister.

As Damgalnuna, she is associated with Asaruludu, a well attested son of Enki, as his mother. She also has a connection to an attested sister of Asaruludu, Lisin. In one text, Lisin is referred to as Ninhursags daughter, where in another she is equated with her. According to the god list An=Anum, Lisin (who here had swapped genders) was a son of Belet-Ili.

Servants

Uznu (Ear) and Hasisu (Wisdom) are listed in An=Anum as the two sukkals of Damgalnunna.

Ninhursag in her mother/birth aspects was also likely affiliated with a group of seven minor goddesses known as the Šassūrātu, "wombs", who were assistants of mother goddesses. These seven appear in Enki and Ninmah to assist in fashioning humankind from clay alongside their mistress, and are listed as Ninimma, Shuzianna, Ninmada, Ninšar, Ninmug, Mumudu, and Ninniginna.

Iconography
Ninhursag was commonly depicted seated upon or near mountains, her hair sometimes in an omega shape and at times wearing a horned head-dress and tiered skirt. In a rectangular framed plaque from pre-Sargonic Girsu, the goddess seated upon "scale like" mountains is determined to be Ninhursag. Here she wears a crown that is more flat without horns, and has hair in an omega like shape. In another depiction, she is seated upon mountains and also has a mountain on her horned crown. Here she wears a tiered robe. She was identified as the female figure standing behind her son Ninurta on a fragment of the Stele of the Vultures.

Another symbol of hers was Deer, both male and female. Studies on a plaque from Mari have identified the stone as being a representation of her. The stone likely represents both a face and the naked female form. A notable feature of the plaque is the area below the 'nose area' where ten stags stand eating plants on opposite sides of the face. There is another group of five animals under the nose, which are suspected to be birds. In a frieze recovered from the same Mari temple, two stags flank an Igmud-eagle, the symbol of her son Ninurta. There are a number of other images with this eagle as well (such as the vase in the gallery below), where deer, ibexes or gazelles are present to represent Ninhursag.

According to Johanna Stuckey, her symbol, resembling the Greek letter omega Ω, has been depicted in art from approximately 3000 BC, although more generally from the early second millennium BC. It appears on some boundary stones (kudurru) on the upper tier, indicating her importance. The omega symbol is associated with the Egyptian cow goddess Hathor, and may represent a stylized womb. Joan Goodnick Westenholz and Julia M. Asher-Greve argue that the symbol should be interpreted as a schematic representation of a woman's hair rather than the shape of an uterus. They tentatively propose an identification with Nanaya rather than Ninhursag as well.

Mythology

Enki and Ninhursag

Two full copies of Enki and Ninhursag have been uncovered. One from in Nippur which contains the complete text (although some passages on the tablet are broken), and another from Ur, found in the house of a priest of Enki, where half of the text is missing. This second tablet contains less lines, thus it is considered a truncated version. There exists also an excerpt, covering the incestuous couplings, which differs from the Nippur versions events.

In Enki and Ninhursag, the goddess complains to Enki that the city of Dilmun is lacking in water. As a result, Enki makes the land rich, and Dilmun becomes a prosperous wetland. Afterwards, he and Ninhursag sleep together, resulting in a daughter, Ninsar. (called Ninnisig in the ETCSL translation, Ninmu by Kramer.)  Ninsar matures quickly, and Enki spots her walking along the bank, and sleeps with her, resulting in another daughter, Ninkurra. Enki spots her and sleeps with her as well, resulting in Uttu. (In alternate versions the order is Ninkura, Ninima, then Uttu. ) After Enki has intercourse with Uttu, Ninhursag removes the semen from her womb and plants it in the earth, causing eight plants to spring up. As a result of his actions, Ninhursag curses Enki by casting her "life giving eye" away from him. Enki then becomes gravely ill. A fox then makes an offer to Enlil that he will bring Ninhursag back to cure him, in exchange Enlil promises to erect two birch trees for the fox in his city, and to give the creature fame. The fox is able to retrieve Ninhursag, and she then cures Enki, giving birth to eight minor deities from his ailing body parts.

Comparisons between this myth and that of Genesis are common. As suggested by Samuel Kramer and W. F. Albright, Enki's eating of the eight plants and the consequences following his actions can be compared to the consumption of the fruit of knowledge by Adam and Eve.

Enki and Ninmah

The text containing this myth has been recovered on tablets from varying locations. The primary two making up the translation are from the Old Babylonian period and were recovered from Nippur. A third tablet from these period was also found containing an extract of the middle of the myth as well. There was also a bilingual (Sumerian and Akkadian) version in the library of Assurbanipal, and one very fragmented tablet from the Middle Assyrian period that may contain the myth, but deviates from the bilingual version in the creation portion of the myth.

Enki and Ninmah as a narrative can be separated into two distinct parts, the first being the birth of mankind, and the second a competition between the two spouses. The first half of this text recounts Enki creating the first humans at the behest of Namma, referred to here as his mother. He receives help forming the body of men and women from Ninmah as well as her seven servants the birth goddesses. Once man is finished the group has a banquet, where Enki and Ninmah drink beer and the other gods praise Enki's greatness. In the second half, Ninmah creates seven humans with illnesses and disabilities, which Enki finds places for in society. Enki then creates an individual so damaged that Ninmah cannot find a place for them, resulting in her losing the competition. She then complains that Enki has driven her away from her home. The ending of the text is not well understood, (due to damage on the tablet) but is likely Enki consoling Ninmah and possibly finding a place for the human he made.

Others

Ninhursag appears in the text Creator of the Hoe, here she is referred to as "the mother of the gods".

In the Anzu epic, Ninhursag under the name Bēlet-ilī or Mami speaks in support of Ninurta her son, and is given the epithet "The Mistress of All Gods". In another myth involving her son, Ninurta's Exploits, the titular god goes out to conquer the mountain land to the north of Babylonia, and piles the bodies of its stony kings into a great burial mound.  He then dedicates this mountain to his mother, once Ninmah, now renamed Ninhursag after the mound.

Damkina is the mother of Marduk in Enūma Eliš.

Worship
Theories posit that, in earlier times, Ninhursag was the highest ranking female deity, but was later displaced from that status by Ninlil, before the Old Babylonian period where she was syncretized with other birthing goddesses.

As Ninhursaga, she had temples in Nippur (Ur III period), and Mari. In Adab, she was worshipped under her Diĝirmaḫ epithet. Under her Ninmah epithet, she had temples in Adab, Babylon, and  Ĝirsu, known as 'E-maḫ' or the 'majestic house'.

A temple of hers from Ur's Early Dynastic Period (Mesopotamia)  was excavated by Sir Leonard Woolley during his series of excavations at various sites around the city, built presumably by a King A'annepada, as per the temple dedication: "Aanepada King of Ur, son of Mesanepada King of Ur, has built this for his lady Ninkhursag." In Early Dynastic Lagash, a temple was dedicated to Ninhursag, then later to Ninmaḫ.

See also
Ereshkigal
Eve
Inanna

References

Citations

Bibliography

External links
Enki and Ninhursag in the Electronic Text Corpus of Sumerian Literature
Enki and Ninmah in the Electronic Text Corpus of Sumerian Literature
Ancient Mesopotamian Gods and Goddesses: Mother Goddess (Ninmah, Nintud/r, Belet-ili)
Temple of Ninmakh in ancient Babylon

Fertility goddesses
Mesopotamian goddesses
Mother goddesses
Mountain goddesses
Tutelary deities
Characters in the Enūma Eliš